Czech Republic and Indonesia established diplomatic relations in 1950. Both nations has agreed to forge ties to deepen relations, especially in business and trade sector. Indonesia has an embassy in Prague, while Czech Republic has an embassy in Jakarta that also accredited to Brunei, Timor Leste, Singapore and ASEAN, and honorary consulates in Bali, Makassar and Surabaya.

History
Although the official diplomatic relations between Czechoslovakia and Indonesia was commenced in 1950, the historic relations established earlier when the Czechoslovak government opened honorary consulates in Batavia (now Jakarta), Dutch East Indies back in 1924. In 1948 Republic of Indonesia established "Indonesian Information Service" in Prague. Czechoslovakia recognized the sovereignty of Indonesia on February 2, 1950, followed by opening a general consulate on March 7, 1950 and upgraded its status to the embassy level in 1957.

Following the 1965 coup in Indonesia, a group of Indonesian communists lived in exile in Prague.

Trade and investment
In July 2012, the Czech Export Bank signed a memorandum of understanding with the Indonesia Exim Bank to finance cooperation in order to support export and import activities between two nation. In 2011, the total value of bilateral trade reached US$500 million. Czech imports from Indonesia consisted of textiles and garments, footwear, rubber and rubber products. On the other hand, Czech exports to Indonesia consisted mainly of machinery chemicals, textile, and power generation and telecommunications equipment.

Diplomatic missions

Indonesia has an embassy in Prague
Czech Republic has an embassy in Jakarta that also accredited to Brunei, Timor Leste, Singapore and ASEAN, and honorary consulates in Bali, Makassar and Surabaya.

See also
Foreign relations of the Czech Republic
Foreign relations of Indonesia
Indonesia–European Union relations
Indonesia–European Union trade relations
ASEAN–European Union relations

References

Further reading
Shoiw-Mei Tseng. Trade Flows between Czech Republic and East Asia (PFD full text). January 2013.

External links 
 Embassy of Czech Republic in Jakarta, Indonesia
 Embassy of Indonesia in Prague, Czech Republic

 
Bilateral relations of Indonesia
Indonesia